The 5th season of Taniec z Gwiazdami, the Polish edition of Dancing With the Stars, started on 4 March 2007 and ended on 6 May 2007. It was broadcast by TVN. Katarzyna Skrzynecka and Hubert Urbański continued as the hosts, and the judges were: Iwona Szymańska-Pavlović, Zbigniew Wodecki, Beata Tyszkiewicz and Piotr Galiński.

Couples

Scores

Red numbers indicate the lowest score for each week.
Green numbers indicate the highest score for each week.
 indicates the couple eliminated that week.
 indicates the returning couple that finished in the bottom two.
 indicates the winning couple of the week.
 indicates the runner-up of the week.

Notes:

Week 1: Krzysztof Tyniec and Bartosz Obuchowicz scored 34 out of 40 on their first dance, making it the highest score in this episode. Rafał Olbrychski got 25 points for his Waltz, making it the lowest score of the week. There was no elimination this week.

Week 2: Krzysztof Tyniec and Bartosz Obuchowicz scored 33 out of 40 on their second dance, making it the highest score in this episode. Rafał Olbrychski got 24 points for his Rumba, making it the lowest score of the week. Wojciech & Magdalena were eliminated despite being 1 points from the bottom.

Week 3: Krzysztof Tyniec and Bartosz Obuchowicz scored 36 out of 40 on their third dance, making it the highest score in this episode. It was the highest score ever in Week 2. Klaudia Carlos, Małgorzata Foremniak, Katarzyna Cichopek, Joanna Liszowska and Peter J. Lucas also got 36 points for their 3rd dance in Week 3. Rafał Olbrychski and Omenaa Mensah got 24 points, making it the lowest score of the week. Anna & Łukasz were eliminated despite being 3 points from the bottom.

Week 4: Krzysztof Tyniec and Ewa Wachowicz scored 37 out of 40 on their 4th dance (Paso Doble), making it the highest score in this episode. Rafał Olbrychski and Katarzyna Tusk got 23 points for their Paso Doble, making it the lowest score of the week and this season. Rafał & Ewa were on the bottom of the leaderboard for the fourth consecutive week. Rafał & Ewa were eliminated.

Week 5: Kasia Cerekwicka scored 35 out of 40 on her 5th dance, making it the highest score in this episode. Omenaa Mensah got 26 points for her Samba, making it the lowest score of the week. Ewa & Marek were eliminated despite being 2 points from the bottom.

Week 6: All couples danced to the most famous songs of Frank Sinatra. Krzysztof Tyniec received his first perfect score for the Foxtrot. Katarzyna Tusk got 26 points for her Foxtrot, making it the lowest score of the week. Omenaa & Rafał were eliminated despite being 3 points from the bottom.

Week 7: All couples danced to the most famous songs of Kabaret Starszych Panów. Kasia Cerekwicka scored 36 out of 40 on her 7th dance, making it the highest score in this episode. Katarzyna Tusk got 29 points for her Cha-cha-cha, making it the lowest score of the week. Bartosz & Kinga were eliminated despite being 1 points from the bottom.

Week 8: All couples danced to the most famous songs of Madonna. Krzysztof Tyniec received his second perfect score for the Paso Doble. Katarzyna Tusk got 28 points for her Quickstep and 29 points for her Samba, making it the lowest score of the week. Kasia & Żora were eliminated despite being 5 points from the bottom.

Week 9: All couples danced to the most famous Italian songs. Krzysztof Tyniec received his third perfect score for the Waltz. Katarzyna Tusk got 26 points for her Jive and 32 points for her Tango, making it the lowest score of the week. Katarzyna & Stefano were on the bottom of the leaderboard for the fourth consecutive week. Katarzyna & Stefano were eliminated.

Week 10: Krzysztof Tyniec received his 4th, 5th and 6th perfect score for the Tango, Paso Doble and Freestyle. Krzysztof Tyniec got 120 out of 120 points, making it the first person getting the highest possible score in the finale. Ivan Komarenko received his first perfect score for the Freestyle. Both couples had to perform three dances: their favorite Latin dance, their favorite Ballroom dance and a Freestyle. Krzysztof Tyniec became the 5th winner in the history of the show. This is the 4th time the season's winner was on the first place on the judges' general scoreboard.

Average chart

Average dance chart

Highest and lowest scoring performances
The best and worst performances in each dance according to the judges' marks are as follows:

The Best Score (40)

Episodes

Week 1
Individual judges scores in charts below (given in parentheses) are listed in this order from left to right: Piotr Galiński, Beata Tyszkiewicz, Zbigniew Wodecki, Ivona Pavlović.

Running order

Week 2
Individual judges scores in charts below (given in parentheses) are listed in this order from left to right: Piotr Galiński, Beata Tyszkiewicz, Zbigniew Wodecki, Ivona Pavlović.

Running order

Week 3
Individual judges scores in charts below (given in parentheses) are listed in this order from left to right: Piotr Galiński, Beata Tyszkiewicz, Zbigniew Wodecki, Ivona Pavlović.

Running order

Week 4
Individual judges scores in charts below (given in parentheses) are listed in this order from left to right: Piotr Galiński, Beata Tyszkiewicz, Zbigniew Wodecki, Ivona Pavlović.

Running order

Week 5

Individual judges scores in charts below (given in parentheses) are listed in this order from left to right: Piotr Galiński, Beata Tyszkiewicz, Zbigniew Wodecki, Ivona Pavlović.

Running order

Robert Rowiński partnered with Katarzyna Tusk because of Stefano Terrazzino's injury.

Week 6: Frank Sinatra Week

Individual judges scores in charts below (given in parentheses) are listed in this order from left to right: Piotr Galiński, Beata Tyszkiewicz, Zbigniew Wodecki, Ivona Pavlović.

Running order

Week 7: Kabaret Starszych Panów Week

Individual judges scores in charts below (given in parentheses) are listed in this order from left to right: Piotr Galiński, Beata Tyszkiewicz, Zbigniew Wodecki, Ivona Pavlović.

Running order

Week 8: Madonna Week
Individual judges scores in charts below (given in parentheses) are listed in this order from left to right: Piotr Galiński, Beata Tyszkiewicz, Zbigniew Wodecki, Ivona Pavlović.

Running order

Week 9: Italian Week
Individual judges scores in charts below (given in parentheses) are listed in this order from left to right: Piotr Galiński, Beata Tyszkiewicz, Zbigniew Wodecki, Ivona Pavlović.

Running order

Week 10: Final
Individual judges scores in charts below (given in parentheses) are listed in this order from left to right: Piotr Galiński, Beata Tyszkiewicz, Zbigniew Wodecki, Ivona Pavlović.

Running order

Other Dances

Dance Schedule
The celebrities and professional partners danced one of these routines for each corresponding week.
 Week 1: Cha-Cha-Cha or Waltz
 Week 2: Rumba or Quickstep
 Week 3: Jive or Tango
 Week 4: Paso Doble or Foxtrot
 Week 5: Samba
 Week 6: One unlearned dance (Frank Sinatra Week)
 Week 7: One unlearned dance & Group Viennese Waltz (Kabaret Starszych Panów Week)
 Week 8: One unlearned dance & one repeated dance (Madonna Week)
 Week 9: One unlearned dance & one repeated dance (Italian Week)
 Week 10: Favorite Latin dance, favorite Ballroom dance & Freestyle

Dances Chart

 Highest scoring dance
 Lowest scoring dance
 Performed, but not scored

Episode results

 This couple came in first place with the judges.
 This couple came in first place with the judges and gained the highest number of viewers' votes.
 This couple gained the highest number of viewers' votes.
 This couple came in last place with the judges and gained the highest number of viewers' votes.
 This couple came in last place with the judges.
 This couple came in last place with the judges and was eliminated.
 This couple was eliminated.
 This couple won the competition.
 This couple came in second in the competition.
 This couple came in third in the competition.

Audience voting results

Guest performances

Rating figures

References

External links
 Official Site - Taniec z gwiazdami
 Taniec z gwiazdami on Polish Wikipedia

Season 05
2007 Polish television seasons